Zere Asylbek (Kyrgyz: Зере Асылбек) is a Kyrgyz singer-songwriter. She released her debut single "Kyz" in 2018.

Discography

Extended plays

Singles

See also
Human rights in Kyrgyzstan

References

External links
Кыз (Music Video) on YouTube

Living people
Kyrgyzstani women singers
Feminist musicians
English-language singers
Year of birth missing (living people)